The Romancing Star (Chinese: 精裝追女仔) is a 1987 Hong Kong romantic comedy film directed by Wong Jing and starring Chow Yun-fat, Eric Tsang, Natalis Chan, Stanley Fung and Maggie Cheung. The film was followed by two sequels The Romancing Star II, released in the following year and The Romancing Star III, released the year after.

Plot
Fred (Chow Yun-fat), a vulgar car repairer, works at a garage together with his two close buddies  Tony (Natalis Chan) and Silver (Eric Tsang). The boss of the garage, Ken (Stanley Fung) puts his friendship with the three in priority, ultimately, despite his calculating, harsh, picky and dingy personality. Both Tony and Silver couldn't put up with the snobbish mother of Fred's girlfriend, Ah Man (Sharla Cheung) thus stirring up troubles on the occasion of her birthday banquet forcing Fred breakup with Ah Man. In order to recover the heartbreak of Fred, Ken decided to cheer him up by joining a tour to Penang, where they came across two beautiful girls, Maggie (Maggie Cheung) and Agnes (Agnes Cheung), strolling leisurely on the beach as if they were very wealthy. Since then they decided on courtship. They played a poker game to decide who’s to who. As fate would've decided, 
winner Fred has chosen Maggie to be his sole target. By the rules of the game, Ken, Tony and Silver have to compete and see who, in the end, will win the heart of Agnes. Maggie and Fred still keep in contact with each other following their return from the trip. One night, Fred decided to invite Maggie to a ball, where she was instantly attracted by a wealthy bachelor called Chiu Ting-sin (Stuart Ong). Fred couldn't tolerate with Chiu's inappropriate acts towards Maggie and he deliberately tricks him, causing the two to incur hatred at each other. To take revenge on Fred, Chiu hired Maggie and Agnes for commercial shootings, and sent his car to the garage where Fred works, thus to expose his real identity as a car repairer to Maggie. Deceived by Fred, Maggie bursted away in a fit of anger and sadness. Chiu was preparing to throw an in-house party to welcome Maggie and Agnes as his guests, but then, he was having a hidden agenda. Fred and his friends were accused of storing drugs and were prisoned. After learning about the intention Chiu is attempting, he and the friends underwent a plan to sneak into the house party and rescue Maggie and Agnes. When Maggie finds out that Chiu actually has an ulterior motive for her, she broke up with him and accepted Fred's confession and apology, as a result, Maggie and Fred got married.

Cast
Chow Yun-fat as Fred Wong Yat-fat
Eric Tsang as Silver / Ugly
Natalis Chan as Tony / Traffic Light
Stanley Fung as Ken Lau Ting-kin
Maggie Cheung as Maggie Tung Man-yuk
Agnes Cheung as Agnes Lee Man-chi
Stuart Ong as Chiu Ting-sin
Sharla Cheung as Man
Wong San as Mr. Due
Leung San as Mrs. Due
Keung Chung-ping as Chiu Ting-sin's Sifu (cameo)
Charlie Cho as One of Mr. Chiu's Employee (cameo)
Anthony Chan as One of Mr. Chiu's Employee (cameo)
Carol Cheng as Susan (cameo)
Philip Chan as Kenny
Wong Jing as Tour guide
Wong Tin-lam as Maggie's father
Soh Hang-suen as Maggie's mother
Ha Kwok-wing as One of Mr Chiu's Guards
Thomas Sin as One of Mr Chiu's Guards
Maria Cordero as orange dance contestant
Sandy Chan Pui-shan 陳佩珊 as Chu
Leung Hak-shun as Chu's father
Cheung Kwok-wah as masked stripper
Seung Koon-yuk as Mrs. Kam
Wang Han-chen as street vendor
Chan Wai-yue as orange dance contestant
Anna Kamiyama as waits for boyfriend with Ferrari
Shing Fuk-n as A Better Tomorrow ending extra
Shing Fui-On as A Better Tomorrow ending extra
Ng Kwok-kin as policeman
Yat-oon Chai as policeman
Cheung Yuen-wah as Ferrari Wong
Mau Kin-tak as Ferrari's boyfriend / Tourist
Che Hung as toilet attendant
Ho Chi-moon as Mr. Due's banquet guest
Chin Tsi-ang as mahjong player
Sherman Wong as Ho/ Traffic policeman

Box office
The film grossed HK$21,720,626 at the Hong Kong box office during its theatrical run from 25 June to 8 July 1987 in Hong Kong.

See also
Chow Yun-fat filmography
Wong Jing filmography

External links

The Romancing Star at Hong Kong Cinemagic

1987 films
1987 romantic comedy films
Hong Kong romantic comedy films
1980s Cantonese-language films
Films directed by Wong Jing
Films set in Hong Kong
Films shot in Hong Kong
1980s Hong Kong films